Edgar Basel (1 November 1930 in Mannheim — 7 September 1977) was a boxer from Germany, who won the silver medal in the flyweight division (– 51 kg) at the 1952 Summer Olympics in Helsinki.

Amateur career
Basel had an outstanding amateur career.  He was a five time German amateur flyweight champion (1951-1952, 1954-1956), and in 1955 he won the European Championship in Berlin (West).

Olympic results 

Edgar Basel (West Germany) was a boxing silver medalist in the flyweight division at the 1952 Helsinki Olympics. Here are his results:

 Round of 16: Defeated Henryk Kukier (Poland) on points (3-0)
 Quarterfinal: defeated Torbjørn Clausen (Norway) by third-round knockout
 Semifinal: Defeated Anatoli Bulakov (Soviet Union) on points (2-1)
 Final: Lost to Nate Brooks (USA) on points (0-3)

Edgar Basel (West Germany) competed as a flyweight boxer at the 1956 Melbourne Olympics. Here are his results:

 Round of 32: Lost to Vladimir Stolnikov (Soviet Union) on points

External links
 databaseOlympics

References

Sportspeople from Mannheim
Flyweight boxers
Boxers at the 1952 Summer Olympics
Boxers at the 1956 Summer Olympics
Olympic boxers of Germany
Olympic boxers of the United Team of Germany
Olympic silver medalists for Germany
1930 births
1977 deaths
Olympic medalists in boxing
German male boxers
Medalists at the 1952 Summer Olympics